Grace Norton (1834 – May 5, 1926) was a noted scholar and lecturer.

She was born in Cambridge, Massachusetts, to parent Andrew Norton and Catherine Eliot Norton[]

. She was the sister of Charles Eliot Norton. She was educated in Cambridge, and read extensively about the literature of France. Norton began studying French authors, chief among them  Michel de Montaigne. An expert on Montaigne and the works of other authors, Norton travelled, lectured, and wrote about them. Her articles appeared in World Literature Today, The Nation, and other publications.

She was a correspondent with Henry James, and worked with Pierre Villey.

References

1834 births
1926 deaths
American writers
People from Cambridge, Massachusetts